Otham Court Ditch is a  long river (brook) and drainage ditch of the Pevensey Levels in the civil parish of Westham, Wealden District of East Sussex, England.

Course 
Divided into two streams, the larger one,  in length, rises from Otham Feed and flows southeasterly into Winters Cut, itself a tributary of Marland Sewer. The second, smaller -long stream rises at the confluence of Duck Puddle and Winters Cut, flowing northerly into the larger stream. Both rivers are located just north of the civil parish of Polegate.

References 

Rivers of East Sussex
Rivers of the Pevensey Levels